Gramofon is a record label and event agency founded in Sarajevo, Bosnia and Herzegovina in 2003. It's the biggest music label of alternative music in Bosnia and Herzegovina.

Since 2003, Gramofon has organized more than 200 concerts and music events. It is also the organizer of the Sarajevo Jazz Festival and Xenophonia festival.

Gramofon is the exclusive distributor for Bosnia and Herzegovina of the labels ECM Records, Enja Records, ACT Music, Doublemoon Records, Pi Recordings, ESC Records, and Intakt Records.

Discography

References

External links
 

Classical music record labels
Jazz record labels
Record labels established in 2003
Companies based in Sarajevo
Bosnia and Herzegovina record labels